Chrismofulvea is a genus of lichen-forming fungi in the family Caliciaceae. The genus was circumscribed by Austrian lichenologist Bernhard Marbach in 2000, with Chrismofulvea dialyta assigned as the type species. It was one of several segregate genera proposed by Marbach in his 2000 revision of American species of Buellia.

Species
Chrismofulvea dialyta 
Chrismofulvea omalia  – Costa Rica
Chrismofulvea pinastri 
Chrismofulvea rubifaciens  – Brazil; Florida

References

Caliciales
Caliciales genera
Lichen genera
Taxa described in 2000